The 1958 Iowa State Senate elections took place as part of the biennial 1958 United States elections. Iowa voters elected state senators in 22 of the state senate's 50 districts. State senators serve four-year terms in the Iowa State Senate.

A statewide map of the 50 state Senate districts in the year 1958 is provided by the Iowa General Assembly here.

The primary election on June 2, 1958 determined which candidates appeared on the November 4, 1958 general election ballot.

Following the previous election, Republicans had control of the Iowa state Senate with 40 seats to Democrats' 10 seats.

To claim control of the chamber from Republicans, the Democrats needed to net 16 Senate seats.

Republicans maintained control of the Iowa State Senate following the 1958 general election with the balance of power shifting to Republicans holding 33 seats and Democrats having 17 seats (a net gain of 7 seats for Democrats).

Summary of Results
Note: The 28 holdover Senators not up for re-election are not listed on this table.

Source:

Detailed Results
NOTE: The 28 districts that did not hold elections in 1958 are not listed here.

Note: The Iowa Secretary of State's website does not document any competitive intra-party primaries for state Senate races in 1958.

District 1

District 7

District 9

District 10

District 12

District 13

District 18

District 20

District 21

District 22

District 29

District 30

District 34

District 35

District 37

District 38

District 42

District 43

District 44

District 45

District 48

District 50

See also
 United States elections, 1958
 United States House of Representatives elections in Iowa, 1958
 Elections in Iowa

References

Senate
Iowa Senate
1958